BAPS Shri Swaminarayan Mandir (also commonly known as the Neasden Temple) is a Hindu temple in Neasden, London, England. Built entirely using traditional methods and materials, the Swaminarayan mandir has been described as being Britain's first authentic Hindu temple. It was also Europe's first traditional Hindu stone temple, as distinct from converted secular buildings. It is a part of the Bochasanwasi Shri Akshar Purushottam Swaminarayan Sanstha (BAPS) organisation and was inaugurated in 1995 by Pramukh Swami Maharaj. The temple complex also consists of a permanent exhibition entitled "Understanding Hinduism" and a cultural centre housing an assembly hall, gymnasium, bookshop, and offices.

The Mandir

The mandir is the focal point of the complex. Designed according to the Shilpa-Shastras, a Vedic text that develops Hindu architecture to metaphorically represent the different attributes of God, it was constructed almost entirely from Indian marble, Italian marble, Sardinian granite and Bulgarian limestone. No iron or steel was used in the construction, a unique feature for a modern building in the UK.

From the conceptual design and vision of Pramukh Swami, the architect C. B. Sompura and his team only used stone for its construction. It is a shikharbaddha mandir: seven tiered pinnacles topped by golden spires crowd the roofline, complemented by five ribbed domes. The temple is noted for its profusely carved cantilevered central dome, believed to be the only one in Britain that does not use steel or lead. Inside, serpentine ribbons of stone link the columns into arches, creating a sense of levitation.

Light cream Vartza limestone from Bulgaria was chosen for the exterior, and for the interior, Italian Carrara marble supplemented by Indian Ambaji marble. The Bulgarian and Italian stone were shipped to the port of Kandla, Gujarat, where most of the carving was eventually completed by over 1,500 craftsmen in a workshop specially set up for the project. More than 26,300 individually numbered stone pieces were shipped back to London, and the building was assembled like a giant three-dimensional jigsaw.

The mandir was inaugurated on 20 August 1995 by Pramukh Swami Maharaj, the spiritual leader of BAPS, the organisation behind the temple.

The entire mandir complex represents an act of faith and collective effort. Inspired by Pramukh Swami Maharaj, more than 1,000 volunteers worked on the building, and many more contributed and solicited donations, or organised sponsored walks and other activities; children raised money by collecting aluminium cans and foil for recycling.

The mandir serves as the centre of worship. Directly beneath each of the seven pinnacles seen from the outside is a shrine. Each of these seven shrines houses murtis (sacred images of the Deities) within altars. Each murti is revered like God in person and devoutly attended to each day by the swamis (monks) who live in the temple ashram.

Beneath the mandir is the permanent exhibition, "Understanding Hinduism." Through 3-D dioramas, paintings, tableaux, and traditional craftwork, it provides an insight into the wisdom and values of Hinduism. Visitors can learn about the origin, beliefs and contribution of Hindu sages and how this ancient religion is being practised today through traditions such as the BAPS Swaminarayan Sampraday.

The mandir is open to all people regardless of religion or nationality. Entrance is free, except for the £2 fee to see the Understanding Hinduism exhibition.

The Haveli

Adjoining the mandir is BAPS Shri Swaminarayan Haveli, a multi-function cultural centre. Whereas the mandir is carved from stone, the haveli is constructed from wood. English oak and Burmese teak have been fashioned into panels, arches and screens, all carved by craftsmen in India with a cornucopia of geometric patterns, stylised animal heads, and flower garlands.

The Burmese teak used was harvested from sustainable forests. To compensate for the 226 English oak trees used, over 2,300 English oak saplings were planted in Devon. The haveli also incorporates energy-saving features such as light-wells.

Richly carved haveli-style woodwork from Gujarat is the most striking characteristic of the building's façade and foyer. It has been designed according to traditional Indian haveli architecture, to evoke feelings of being in Gujarat, India, where such havelis were once commonplace. It required over 150 craftsmen from all over India three years to carve 1,579 m2 (17,000 square feet) of wood. Behind the traditional wooden façade, the cultural centre houses a vast pillarless prayer hall with space for 3,000 people, a gymnasium, medical centre, dining facilities, bookstall, conference facilities, and offices.

Access
The temple is close to the North Circular Road, and can be reached by bus or on foot from Wembley Park, Stonebridge Park, Harlesden, and Neasden Underground and Overground stations.

The proposed West London Orbital railway would serve the temple.

History

The Mandir and Haveli were built and funded entirely by the Hindu community, and the entire project spanned five years, although the construction itself was completed in two-and-a-half years. Building work began in August 1992. On 24 November 1992, the temple recorded the biggest-ever concrete-pour in the UK, when 4,500 tons were laid in 24 hours to create a foundation mat 6 ft (1.8m) thick. The first stone was laid in June 1993; two years later, the building was complete.

The mandir was cited in Guinness World Records 2000 as follows:

Since 2000, it has been surpassed in size by other BAPS mandirs elsewhere.

Overview
June 1970: The first BAPS Swaminarayan Mandir in the UK was opened in a converted disused church in Islington, North London, by Yogiji Maharaj
1982: Having outgrown the temple, the congregation moved from the Islington temple to a small, former warehouse in Neasden.
1990: BAPS was again in search of a building that could cope with the growing congregation, and plans for the present temple were made.
1995: They moved to their present temple, built on the site of a disused truck warehouse opposite the previous temple. The old temple building was retained and converted into Shayona, an Indian grocery shop and vegetarian restaurant.

Akshar IT Centre
Adjacent to the Shayona restaurant is the Akshar IT Centre, an adult learning centre providing government-accredited IT course to the public.

The Swaminarayan School

Opposite the Mandir is The Swaminarayan School, Europe's first independent Hindu school. Founded in 1992 by Pramukh Swami Maharaj, it follows the National Curriculum, while promoting aspects of Hinduism and Hindu culture, such as dance, music and language. The school's premises formerly housed Sladebrook High School, which closed in 1990.

The 2007 GCSE results placed the school fourth among all independent schools in the country. On June 25 2018, the school publicly announced that it would be shutting down. The school formally shut down on 31st August 2021.

Daily rituals
Before sunrise, the murtis which are adorned in their night attire are woken by the swamis and the shrine doors are opened for the Mangala Aarti, which is the first of five Aarti rituals offered during the day. Aarti is a ritual wherein a specific prayer is recited to a poetic format with music while the swamis wave a lighted lamp in front of the murtis. The swamis recite some shlokas (prayers), serve the deities, offer them food and bathe them, and close the shrine doors.

The shrines are opened again for the second arti (Shangar Arti). The shrines remain open from 9:00 am to approximately 11:00 am, when the shrines are closed and offered thal (food for lunch).
At 11.45 am, the shrines are opened for the midday arti (Rajbhog Arti), and the thal (offering hymn) is recited before the Deities. The shrines are closed after this to allow the Deities to rest during the afternoon.

The shrines re-open at 4:00 pm (3:30 pm on weekends) until 6:30 pm for darshan.
The Sandhya Arti (sunset arti) follows at 7:00 pm. Thereafter, a selection of prayers are recited by the devotees including dhun (where the names of God are chanted and verses of praise are sung). The shrines are closed again for approximately one hour so they can be offered their final meal by the swamis (monks).

The Deities are then prepared for the night and adorned in their evening attire by the swamis.
The shrines are opened a final time for the Shayan Arti (nighttime arti), with the lights dimmed and music lowered. The devotees recite a few hymns, gently sending the Deities to sleep, before the shrines are finally closed for the night.

Awards and recognition

Pride of Place Award
The Mandir was awarded the 'UK Pride of Place' award in December 2007 by Government authorities after a nationwide online poll.

Seven wonders of London
Time Out declared the Mandir as one of the "Seven Wonders of London". In an "epic series... to pay tribute to... the capital's seven most iconic buildings and landmarks", they embarked upon an ambitious search of London's best.

Guinness World Records
In 2000, Guinness World Records presented two certificates to recognise the world record of offering 1,247 vegetarian dishes during the Annakut Festival held at the Shri Swaminarayan Mandir, London on 27 October 2000, and secondly to recognise the largest traditionally built Hindu temple outside India.

The Eventful 20th Century – 70 Wonders of the Modern World
Reader's Digest (1998) featured the Shri Swaminarayan Mandir lauding its scale, intricate detail and the extraordinary story of how it was built and inspired by Pramukh Swami Maharaj.

Royal Commission on the Historical Monuments of England
The 1997/8 Annual Report of the Royal Commission on the Historical Monuments of England, featured the Mandir, and referred to as a "modern building of major importance in our multicultural society."

Most Enterprising Building Award
The Most Enterprising Building Award 1996 was awarded by the Royal Fine Art Commission & British Sky Broadcasting to the Swaminarayan Mandir in London on 5 June 1996.

Natural Stone Award
The Stone Federation issued a special award to the Swaminarayan Hindu Mandir in 1995 as part of its Natural Stone Awards.

See also

 Hinduism in England
 Shree Sanatan Hindu Mandir

References

External links
 
londonmandir.baps.org
www.baps.org

1992 establishments in England
Buildings and structures completed in 1995
Swaminarayan temples
Hindu temples in London
Religion in the London Borough of Brent
Buildings and structures in the London Borough of Brent
Tourist attractions in the London Borough of Brent
Gujarati diaspora